PJSC Motovilikha Plants / Motovilikhinskiye Zavody PAO (MOTZ.MM) is a Russian metallurgical and military equipment manufacturer. In 2016 Motovilikha Plants joined NPO Splav, a Rostec company. It is named after the former town of Motovilikha, where it's located, which in 1938 was amalgamated into the city of Perm. The town in turn was named after the eponymous river, a small Kama tributary.

History

The plant was established in 1736, when Empress Anna ordered the establishment of a smelter to produce steel for the nearby factories that existed at the time, supplying steel blocks for the manufacture of rifles and guns. By the late 18th century the manufacturing of weapons began in the village of Motovilikha, to meet the increasing demand. Guns from Motovilikha were used in all the wars in which Russia was involved in the first half of the 19th century, including the Napoleonic Wars and the Crimean war.

The second half of the 19th century saw increasing efforts to implement industrial-age manufacturing in Russia, which in 1871 led to the consolidation of all the metal smelters and weapons workshops in the region in a single facility based in the city of Perm.

The plant launched the first steamship in the Urals, in 1871, and the first steam locomotive the following year. In 1893, Nikolay Slavyanov introduced shielded metal arc welding while working at the Perm plant. By 1914 the factory was manufacturing every third cannon in Russia. The early Soviet era saw the facilities being used to manufacture a wide range of machinery, including machine tools, cranes and construction equipment. After the outbreak of World War II the factory returned to the production of heavy weaponry, resuming production of civilian equipment only after the war ended.

In 2011, a modern artillery production line was established at the plant. Bankruptcy proceedings against the company began in March 2018, and the company delisted from the stock market during the same month.

Products
 130 mm towed field gun M1954 (M-46)
 9A52-4 Tornado
 2S9 Nona
 152 mm towed gun-howitzer M1955 (D-20)
 122 mm gun M1931/37 (A-19)
 122 mm howitzer M1938 (M-30)

References

External links
 
  
 

Defence companies of the Soviet Union
Manufacturing companies of the Soviet Union
Manufacturing companies of Russia
Companies based in Perm, Russia
Companies formerly listed on the Moscow Exchange
Defence companies of Russia
Tecmash
Companies established in 1736